Neoterpes is a genus of moths in the family Geometridae described by George Duryea Hulst in 1896.

Species
Neoterpes ephelidaria (Hulst, 1886)
Neoterpes trianguliferata (Packard, 1871)
Neoterpes edwardsata (Packard, 1871)
Neoterpes graefiaria (Hulst, 1887)

References

Ourapterygini